Sangyuan is a town in Qionglai City, in Sichuan province, China. , it has one residential community and eight villages under its administration.

See also 
 List of township-level divisions of Sichuan

References 

Towns in Sichuan
Qionglai City